Chanvar fields encompass single plot of 96,000 bhigas of cultivable land without any houses on it. It is part of Gangetic flood plains of Mirzapur district in Uttar Pradesh. (Bhiga means wet or wetted; 1 bhiga = 100 square rods, 3025 square yards or 0.2529 hectares;  96,000  bhigas accordingly encompasses 60,000 acres.)

See also 
 Cartography of India
 Great Trigonometric Survey
 Nibi Gaharwar

References

External links 
 Harvesting at Nibi Gaharwar Chanvar Fields 

Villages in Mirzapur district